Midway Township is the name of some places in the U.S. state of Minnesota:
Midway Township, Cottonwood County, Minnesota
Midway Township, St. Louis County, Minnesota

See also: Midway Township (disambiguation)

Minnesota township disambiguation pages